The 1948 Campeonato Argentino de Rugby was won by the selection of "Capital" that beat in the final the selection of Buenos Aires Province ("Provincia") "(provincia)".

That year in Argentinian rugby union
 The most important event was the Tour of Oxford-Cambridge selection formed by a lot of British international player, that won all the nine matches played.
 The "Championship of Buenos Aires" was won by San Isidro Club
 The "Cordoba Province Championship" was won by Jockey Club Córdoba
 The North-East Championship was won by Tucumán Rugby Club

Knock out stages

Final

Bibliography 
  Memorias de la UAR 1948
  IV Campeonato Argentino

Campeonato Argentino de Rugby
Argentina
Rugby